Pedro López Lagar (18 June 1899, in Madrid – 21 August 1977, in Buenos Aires) was a Spanish born Argentine film actor of the 1940s and 1950s.
 
Although born in Madrid he moved to Argentina as a young man and began acting in film in 1938. He played with Enrique Borrás and Margarita Xirgu in La sirena varada, by Alejandro Casona, released in 1934. He made some 20 film appearances but his career was at its peak in the mid to late 1940s, with Lopez appearing in Albéniz in 1946 and A sangre fría in 1947 in which he starred alongside Tito Alonso and Amelia Bence.

Selected filmography
 Son cartas de amor (1943)
 Two Angels and a Sinner (1945)
 Road of Hell (1946)
Suburb (1951)

References

External links
 

Argentine male film actors
1899 births
1977 deaths
People from Buenos Aires
20th-century Argentine male actors
Spanish emigrants to Argentina